Chris Dyer (born March 3, 1979) is a Peruvian–Canadian artist based in Montreal, who exhibits, performs and teaches his art worldwide. Some of his broader artistic themes include consciousness, truth, oneness, introspection, personal development and kindness. He paints using acrylic, pencil, pen, spray paint, gouache and other media on a variety of different forms, including broken or blank skateboards in his early years, various sculptured and recycled items, and now commonly fabric or wood canvas. He is also known for his murals, logos, album covers, posters, illustrations, comic books, travel diaries (The Sunlight Chronicles), and YouTube adventure vlogs (Artventures). He was the art director and brand manager of Creation Skateboards/Satori Movement for three and a half years, creating designs for hundreds of skateboard decks. He teaches many art workshops and classes on technique, spray painting, traditional medicinal healing, and the business of art, as well as offering an online class. He has created his own brand of conscious clothing and other goods, Positive Creations, which features some of his most well-loved art. Though his styles, mediums and subject matters are always in flow, the main theme seen through his artwork is cultural and spiritual oneness of humanity and beyond.

Life
Born in Ottawa, Ontario, Canada, Dyer moved to Lima, Peru at age 4. Dyer started skateboarding at 8 years old, and later started to surf at 12. By 14 years old he joined a soccer fan based street gang called "SepUlcro", who were fans of the Universitario de Deportes. Dyer' parents sent him to Canada to study in 1996, at age 17. He lived in Ottawa with his grandmother, where he attended Heritage College and University of Ottawa and during those years he was a heavy drinker and was very self-destructive. He moved to Montreal in 2000 to study Illustration at Dawson College. In the summer of 2001 he went tree planting, which directed Dyer towards a pursuit of a much more spiritual path. Later in life Dyer studied under (and later taught alongside) visionary masters, including Alex Grey, Robert Venosa, Martina Hoffman, Laurence Caruana, A. Andrew Gonzales, Maura Holden, and Amanda Sage. Traveling is a big part of Dyer' explorative lifestyle, having visited over 40 countries to paint street murals, live paint at festivals, and produce gallery shows. One of the countries where he had a solo exhibition was Belgium, where he met Valerie Lambert, whom he married in 2010, but then divorced in 2016.

Art career
Dyer started his freelance art career locally, by doing art exhibitions in Montreal. It did not take too long until his work started getting featured in magazines like Thrasher and High Times. This exposure got him further commercial commissions, along solo exhibitions in places like Peru, Mexico, Belgium and all across the United States and Canada. To this point, he has exhibited at galleries around the world, including Vienna, Bali, Costa Rica, Spain, Paris, Berlin, Tokyo, New York City, Denver and Los Angeles. He has shown with renowned artists such as Alex Grey, Shepard Fairey, Robert Venosa, H.R. Giger, and Romio Shrestha. He has also worked with skateboard art legends like Jim Phillips, Wes Humpston, and Andy Howell. Other than exhibiting he also travels to live paint at events and big music festivals like  Burning Man (Nevada), Shambhala (British Columbia), and Boom (Portugal).

Dyer launched his own brand, Positive Creations, in 2003, and offers a wide variety of products such as clothing, tapestries, books, backpacks, watches, DVDs, etc. In 2008, he filmed and co-directed a full feature documentary of his life with Dreamtime Cinema. Positive Creations was released as DVD in 2010 and for free on his YouTube channel.

In 2011, Schiffer Publications released a 256-page, hardcover book, of his art. Following that was a coloring book for adults that was published by Last Gasp in 2016.

In the late 2010s, he started offering painting workshops at local high schools in Montreal. This led to offering workshops for artists in places like Italy, Bali, India, Thailand, and Australia. He now offers them at institutions such as the Montreal Museum of Fine Arts, the National Gallery of Canada, The Chapel of Sacred Mirrors and The Vienna Academy of Visionary Art. Starting in 2017, he created an art workshop combined with healing shamanic ceremonies, at Katari Center, in the jungle near Tarapoto, Peru.

Dyer has painted murals in notable places such as the Bob Marley Mausoleum and Museum in Nine Mile, Jamaica as well as the Beatles Ashram in Rishikesh, India.

He has created artwork for CD album covers or concert posters for musicians such as Ott, String Cheese Incident, Third World, 12th Planet, The Gaslamp Killer, and more. Additionally, he has live-painted for musical artists such as Diplo, Tipper, Immortal Technique, Nahko Bear, Cut Chemist and many others.

Skate art

Dyer started skateboarding on Christmas of 1986 and still does today. It was in the year 2000 when he started doing his paintings on broken skateboards he had ridden and collected over the years. His recycled skate paintings made him stand out in the Montreal art scene and introduced his work to skateboarders around the world, mostly via skate magazines articles. In 2004, he landed his dream job, doing skate graphics for Creation Skateboards, from San Francisco who had him over in California for many years.  By 2011 Dyer was promoted to the position of Art Director and Brand Manager for Creation Skateboards, a position he kept for 3.5 years, creating 6 different catalogs and directed the skate video "Soul Harmonics". Dyer continues to freelance for a number of different skate brands, such as Santa Cruz, Deathwish, Think, Skull, and more and by now has done over 100 commercial skateboard graphics. By the end of the 2010s, Dyer was doing less fine-art skateboard deck paintings, and had moved into whole installations (like his "Skatebot Army") structured from reclaimed skateboards.

Street art

Dyer's first interaction with aerosols was in 1993, when he would tag many walls of Lima, Peru, where he would publicize the name of the street gang he belonged to (Sepulcro Crema). Dyer's younger brother Patrick (a.k.a. Peru 143) later started doing graffiti, so Chris stayed away from that medium for many years, as to avoid brotherly competition. It was later in 2007, when the brothers became roommates in Montreal, that they started to jam in their backyard and Chris got addicted to that medium. These days, spray paint is one of Chris' main mediums, especially in the outdoor seasons and while on the road. His intentions are to beautify the world and leave his trace as he explores the globe. You can find many of Chris's bright colorful murals all over the planet. Though Chris' favorite jams are organically organized block parties, he has also been invited to paint murals for well respected festivals like MURAL Festival, Art Basel Miami, Rainbow Serpent Festival in Australia, Ozora Festival in Hungary and Puro Muro in Lima, Peru.

Publications
 2006 – Pipe Fiends (Media Mudscout) 
 2007 – Concrete 2 Canvas More Skateboarders' Art (Laurence King Publishing Ltd) 
 2008 – Drawgasmic (Cranky Yellow Publishing)
 2008 – The Sunlight Chronicles (Divine Life Publishing LLC) 
 2010 – Featured in Maple Vedas by K. Gandhar Chakravarty (8th House Publishing) 
 2010 – Visionary Art Yearbook (Blurb Creative Publishing) 
 2011 – Positive Creations (Schiffer Publishing Ltd.) 
 2012 – Divining the Dream .
 2015 – Arte Visionaria (Prismas Editoria) 
 2016 – Chris Dyer's Kick-Ass Coloring Book by Chris Dyer (Last Gasp of San Francisco) 
2018 – Street Art Themes et Motifs by Pierre Toromanoff (Fancy Books) 
2018 – The New Psychedelic Revolution" by James Oroc (Park Street Press) 
2018 – Feminine Mysticism in Arts: Artists Envisioning the Divine by Victoria Christian and Susan Steadman (Awakening Soul Wisdom)  
2018 – Painted Walls La Habana by Amir Saarony (Old Cuban Cigar Stuff)  
2019 – Thrasher Magazine's Mail Drop Book – 38 Years of Envelope Art (Generic Publishing)

References

Devaney, Jacob, "Taking it To the Streets". Huffington Post. 2013. Retrieved October 30, 2013.
Brooke, Michael, "Positive Creations". Concrete Wave Magazine. 2012. Retrieved 4 January 2013.
Dyer, Chris, "Positive Creations". Dreamtime Cinema. Documentary. 2011. Retrieved 4 January 2013.
Fuenzalida, Danny, "Canvas". Thrasher Magazine. 2007. Retrieved 4 January 2013.
Greenway, Kathryn, "Moving Beyond Skateboard Art". The Montreal Gazette Newspaper. 2009. Retrieved 4 January 2013.
Greenway. Kathryn, "His Art Goes Across The Board". The Montreal Gazette Newspaper. 2004. Retrieved 4 January 2013.
McDonough, Elise, "Positive Vibrations". High Times Magazine. 2013. Retrieved 10 January 2013.
Roberdo, "The Cover Artist". Mushroom Magazine. 2011. Retrieved 4 January 2013.
Vriend, Rosanne, "Soul Skater". Salt Magazine. 2011. Retrieved 4 January 2013.
Gray, Karyn,  "The Art of Skate"  "Ion Magazine" 2014
Grey, Alex,  "Psychic Connection". "Juxtapoz Magazine" 2015
Julien, Anne "Chris Dyer" . "Hey Magazine" 2016

External links
 Official Website
 Official Chris Dyer Fanpage
 Online Store

1979 births
Canadian contemporary artists
Living people